Miguel Agustín Palafox Prudencio (born December 29, 1994) is an American soccer player.

Early life
Palafox was born in Los Angeles, California.  He is an American of Mexican and Salvadoran descent.

Career

Club Leon
After a high school career at Taft in Los Angeles, Palafox trialed with several Liga MX clubs via Alianza de Futbol Hispano, an organization that gears to develop Hispanic soccer at the amateur level.  Through Alianza de Futbol Hispano, Palafox was able to secure a contract with Club León of Liga MX in April 2014.

Palafox made his professional league debut with León on April 12, 2014 as a starter against Toluca. León won both the Apertura and Clausura in the 2013–14 Liga MX season.

Santa Tecla
On June 20, 2015 it was announced that Palafox signed to Santa Tecla of the Salvadoran Primera División.

New York Cosmos B
On May 6, 2016 it was announced that Palafox signed to New York Cosmos B of the National Premier Soccer League.

Las Vegas Lights
After attending an open tryout, Palafox joined USL Championship side Las Vegas Lights ahead of their 2019 season.

References

External links
 

1994 births
Living people
American soccer players
Mexican footballers
American sportspeople of Mexican descent
American sportspeople of Salvadoran descent
Club León footballers
Soccer players from California
Liga MX players
Expatriate footballers in Mexico
American expatriate sportspeople in Mexico
Santa Tecla F.C. footballers
Association football defenders
Las Vegas Lights FC players
USL Championship players